is a Japanese otogi-zōshi in one volume.

Date, genre and title 
Urashima Tarō was composed during the Muromachi period. It is a work of the otogi-zōshi genre. Most of the surviving manuscripts of the work give its title as simply Urashima, written in hiragana.

Plot 
Urashima Tarō of Tango Province spares the life of a turtle he has caught and releases it. The next day a beautiful woman arrives on a small boat, and requests Tarō escort her back to her country. He takes her to her home in the Dragon Palace, and becomes her husband. Three years later, he becomes homesick and requests her leave to go visit his home. His wife protests, but allows him to return home for time, admitting that she is the turtle he saved and entrusting him with a box as a keepsake, which she warns him never to open. On Tarō's return to his home, he learns to his shock that 700 years have passed. Without thinking, he opens the box he had received from his wife, and from it emerges purple cloud and his form changes. He becomes a crane and at Hōrai meets again with the turtle. After this, he appears as the god .

Textual tradition 
The work is generally in one kan (scroll or book). It survives in numerous manuscripts, including:
 a fragmentary picture scroll in the holdings of the Japanese Folk Crafts Museum, dating to the middle of the Muromachi period and including only the latter portion of the work;
 a picture scroll from the late Muromachi period, also in the holdings of the Japanese Folk Crafts Museum;
 a manuscript in the holdings of the Dai-Tōkyū Kinen Bunko (大東急記念文庫);
 the Takayasu-kyūzō-bon (高安旧蔵本), which is of a different textual line to the above three copies;
 the Tokushi-kyūzō-bon (禿氏旧蔵本), which is close to the later printed text (see below);

Notes

References

Works cited 

 

Otogi-zōshi
Muromachi-period works